The London, Midland and Scottish Railway and British Railways Class 4 2-6-4T was a family of classes of steam locomotives.  A grand total of 800 engines were built to five separate designs by four different mechanical engineers, over a period of 29 years.  Each new design was a development of the previous one.  The LMS gave the whole family the power classification 4P, BR 4MT.  It is therefore worth considering them as a group as follows:

Withdrawal 

All engines were withdrawn from stock between 1959 and 1967, summarised as follows:

Technical comparison 

For technical purposes, it is worth splitting the Fairburn tanks into two subclasses; early (42050–42146) and late (42147–42699) as their weights differ slightly.

References

4
2-6-4T locomotives
Railway locomotives introduced in 1927